Doyran, also spelled Doiran or Dojran, is a Macedonian place name that may refer to:

Battles
 Battle of Doiran refers to several battles that took place near Doiran Lake in Macedonia:
 Battle of Doiran (1913), during the Second Balkan War
 Battle of Doiran (1916), during World War I
 Battle of Doiran (1917), during World War I
 Battle of Doiran (1918), during World War I

Places

Antarctica
 Doyran Heights, named after Doyrantsi, Bulgaria

Bulgaria
 Doyrantsi

Greece
 Doirani, across the Macedonia-Greece border from and named after Dojran, Macedonia

Iran
 Doyran, Iran, a village in West Azerbaijan Province, Iran

Macedonia
 Dojran, a city destroyed during World War I
 Nov Dojran, New Dojran, a village near the city
 Star Dojran, Old Dojran, a village near the city
 Doiran Lake, a lake that Dojran borders

Turkey
 Doyran, Adıyaman, a village in the District of Adıyaman, Adıyaman Province
 Doyran, Edirne
 Doyran, Vezirköprü, a village in the Vezirköprü, Samsun Province